Norman Kenneth Moon (born November 4, 1936) is an American judge. After engaging in the practice of law, Moon served as a trial court judge in Virginia and on the  Court of Appeals of Virginia before being appointed as a United States district judge of the United States District Court for the Western District of Virginia in 1997. He took senior status in 2010.

Education and career

Born in Lynchburg, Virginia, Moon received his Bachelor of Arts from the University of Virginia in 1959 and his Juris Doctor from the University of Virginia School of Law in 1962. He was in private practice in Lynchburg from 1962 to 1974. He was a judge on the Twenty-fourth Judicial Circuit of Virginia from 1974 to 1985, serving as Chief Judge from 1983 to 1984. He was a judge on the Court of Appeals of Virginia from 1985 to 1997, serving as Chief Judge from 1993 to 1997. He received a LL.M. from the University of Virginia School of Law in 1988.

Federal judicial service

On October 8, 1997, Moon was nominated by President Bill Clinton to a seat on the United States District Court for the Western District of Virginia vacated by Jackson L. Kiser. Moon was confirmed by the United States Senate on November 7, 1997, and received his commission on November 12, 1997. He took senior status on July 1, 2010.

References

External links

1936 births
Living people
Judges of the United States District Court for the Western District of Virginia
United States district court judges appointed by Bill Clinton
University of Virginia alumni
University of Virginia School of Law alumni
Politicians from Lynchburg, Virginia
Judges of the Court of Appeals of Virginia
20th-century American judges
21st-century American judges
Virginia circuit court judges